The Royal Highland Fusiliers of Canada is a Primary Reserve light infantry regiment of the Canadian Army, with companies in Cambridge and Kitchener, and is an infantry sub-unit of 31 Canadian Brigade Group, headquartered in London, Ontario. The Princess Margaret, Countess of Snowdon and The Prince Andrew, Duke of York, as members of the Canadian Royal Family, acted as Colonel-in-Chief.

Lineage

The Royal Highland Fusiliers of Canada

Originated 14 September 1866 in Berlin, Ontario, as the 29th Waterloo Battalion of Infantry
Redesignated 8 May 1900 as the 29th Waterloo Regiment
Redesignated 15 April 1915 as the 29th Regiment (Highland Light Infantry of Canada)
Redesignated 29 March 1920 as The Highland Light Infantry of Canada
Redesignated 7 November 1940 as the 2nd (Reserve) Battalion, The Highland Light Infantry of Canada
Redesignated 1 May 1946 as The Highland Light Infantry of Canada
Amalgamated 1 October 1954 with The Perth Regiment and renamed as The Perth and Waterloo Regiment (Highland Light Infantry of Canada)
Amalgamation ceased 1 April 1957, the two regiments ceased to be amalgamated and resumed their former designations
Amalgamated 26 February 1965 with The Scots Fusiliers of Canada and redesignated as The Highland Fusiliers of Canada
Redesignated 7 July 1998 as The Royal Highland Fusiliers of Canada

The Scots Fusiliers of Canada 

Originated 21 September 1914 in Berlin, Ontario when an "eight company regiment of infantry" was authorized to be formed.
Designated 1 February 1915 as the 108th Regiment
Redesignated 29 March 1920 as The Waterloo Regiment
Redesignated 3 August 1920 as the North Waterloo Regiment
Redesignated 15 September 1928 as The Scots Fusiliers of Canada
Redesignated 5 March 1942 as the 2nd (Reserve) Battalion, The Scots Fusiliers of Canada
Redesignated 15 October 1943 as The Scots Fusiliers of Canada (Reserve)
Redesignated 7 November 1945 as The Scots Fusiliers of Canada
Converted 1 April 1946 to artillery and redesignated as the 54th Light Anti-Aircraft Regiment (Scots Fusiliers of Canada), RCA
Converted 1 December 1959 to infantry and redesignated as The Scots Fusiliers of Canada
Amalgamated 26 February 1965 with The Highland Light Infantry of Canada

Lineage chart

History

The Great War
The 34th Battalion, CEF, was authorized on 7 November 1914 and embarked for Britain on 23 October 1915, where it provided reinforcements to Canadian units in the field until 27 November 1916, when it was reorganized as the 34th Battalion (Boys'), CEF. The battalion was subsequently disbanded on 17 July 1917.

It was recruited in Guelph, Ontario, and district and was mobilized at Guelph. It had one Officer Commanding, Lt.-Col. A.J. Oliver, who commanded the battalion from 23 October 1915 to 6 July 1916.

The 111th Battalion (South Waterloo), CEF was authorized on 22 December 1915 and embarked for Britain on 25 September 1916 where on 13 October 1916 its personnel were absorbed by the 35th Battalion, CEF to provide reinforcements for Canadian units in the field. The 111th Battalion was disbanded on 21 May 1917.

The 118th (North Waterloo) Battalion, CEF was authorized on 22 December 1915 and embarked for Britain on 22 January 1917 where on 6 February 1917, its personnel were absorbed by the 25th Reserve Battalion, CEF, to provide reinforcements for Canadian units in the field. The 118th Battalion was disbanded on 17 July 1917.

The regiment perpetuates all these three battalions.

The Second World War
The Highland Light Infantry of Canada mobilized the Highland Light Infantry of Canada, CASF, for active service on 24 May 1940. It was redesignated as the 1st Battalion, The Highland Light Infantry of Canada, CASF, on 7 November 1940 and embarked for Britain on 20 July 1941. On D-Day, 6 June 1944, it landed on Juno Beach in Normandy as part of the 9th Canadian Infantry Brigade, 3rd Canadian Infantry Division, and it continued to fight in North-West Europe until the end of the war. The overseas battalion was disbanded on 15 January 1946. The regiment subsequently mobilized the 3rd Battalion, The Highland Light Infantry of Canada, Canadian Infantry Corps, Canadian Army Occupation Force on 1 June 1945 for service in Germany. The 3rd Battalion was disbanded on 1 May 1946.

The Scots Fusiliers mobilized the 1st Battalion, The Scots Fusiliers, CASF, for active service on 5 March 1942. It served in Canada in a home defence role as part of Military District No. 2 until the battalion was disbanded on 15 October 1943.

On D-Day, June 6, 1944, the regiment disembarking at Nan sector on Juno Beach with the rest of the 9th Brigade, the Stormont, Dundas and Glengarry Highlanders, and the North Nova Scotia Highlanders. These regiments were not in the first wave assault, but landed later in the morning and advanced through the lead brigades.

The Highland Light Infantry continued to serve through out Europe. From D-day to the end of war of Europe the regiment became one of the most battle hardened units in the Canadian army.

War In Afghanistan
The regiment contributed an aggregate of more than 20% of its authorized strength to the various Task Forces which served in Afghanistan between 2002 and 2014.

Alliances
 - The Royal Highland Fusiliers, 2nd Bn, Royal Regiment of Scotland - 2 SCOTS
 - 52nd Lowland Volunteers, 6th Bn, Royal Regiment of Scotland - 6 SCOTS

Battle honours 
Battle honours in small capitals are for large operations and campaigns and those in lowercase are for more specific battles. Bold type indicates honours emblazoned on the regimental colour.

Armoury

See also

 Canadian-Scottish regiment
 List of Canadian organizations with royal patronage
 Highland Light Infantry of Canada
 Highland Light Infantry
 The Canadian Crown and the Canadian Forces
 Military history of Canada
 History of the Canadian Army
 Canadian Forces
 List of armouries in Canada

Notes

References

 
 Canadian Expeditionary Force 1914-1919 by Col. G.W.L. Nicholson, CD, Queen's Printer, Ottawa, Ontario, 1962

External links
 
 Royal Highland Fusiliers of Canada Regimental Association
 Juno Beach Centre
 Juno Beach – The Canadians On D-Day
 Canadian battle plan at Juno Beach, at stormpages.com
 Canadians take Juno! Complete battle overview, photos, video, audio and much info.
 D-Day: Etat des Lieux: Juno Beach

Royal Highland Fusiliers of Canada
Military units and formations established in 1866
Military units and formations of Ontario
1866 establishments in Canada
Infantry regiments of Canada in World War II